Reintaler See is a lake of Tyrol, Austria.

Reintaler See is located at the southern foot of the Voldöppberg in the Brandenberg Alps. The lake is divided into three basins, the maximum depth of the eastern basin is 10.30 m, the north basin 9.90 m and the west basin 7.60 m. The lake is essentially fed by groundwater and drained from the western basin to Krummsee.

Lakes of Tyrol (state)